Baima Township is a township of northeastern Yi County in the eastern foothills of the Taihang Mountains in west-central Hebei province, China, located adjacent to and northeast of the county seat as the crow flies. , it has 18 villages under its administration:
Zhongbaima Village
Dongbaima Village
Xibaima Village
Nanbaima Village
Beibaima Village
Qilizhuang Village
Weijiafen Village
Ruixiaqiao Village
Xizhangjiazhuang Village
Panshenmiao Village
Zhenwumiao Village
Shangbaiyang Village
Shanghuanghao Village
Xibaiyang Village
Nanbaiyang Village
Dongbaiyang Village
Majiazhuang Village
Yuanquan Village

See also 
 List of township-level divisions of Hebei

References 

Township-level divisions of Hebei
Yi County, Hebei